"Go In and Out the Window" (or "Round the Village") is a popular song composed by Hall of Fame songwriter Lew Pollack (1895–1946). The song remains popular 
as a children's music standard.

External links
http://www.bluegrassmessengers.com/go-in-and-out-the-window--version-3-english-1898.aspx

Children's songs
Songs written by Lew Pollack